Bilchar Dobani or Dobani Peak is a  mountain peak located between Bilchar, Taisot, Haramosh and Bagrot valley, in Gilgit district of the autonomous territory of Gilgit-Baltistan, in Pakistan.

Location 
The mountain is located as an isolated subrange in southeast of Rakaposhi subrange and southwest of Haramosh Mountains. The western face of Dobani Peak is located in the Tesot valley, and to the north of it is the Bagrot valley. In the northwest of the mountain is found the Haramosh mountains range. The Bagrot Valley runs along the western flank of Bilchhar Dobani.

First ascent
The Bilchhar Dobani was first climbed by two Japanese mountaineers Isao Ikeuchi and Masaru Hashimoto via the west face and northern ridge on 9 June 1979.

See also
 Jalalabad
 Danyor
 Oshikhandass

Gallery

References

External links 
 
 
 Bilchhar Dobani at panoramio.com
 Bilchhar Dobani at flickr.com
 himalaya-info.org

Mountains of Gilgit-Baltistan